Scott Allan Jordan (last name pronounced Jur-dan, born May 22, 1963) is an American former Major League Baseball outfielder who played with the Cleveland Indians in 1988.

Biography
In college, Jordan was a standout player for the Georgia Tech Yellow Jackets, and still holds the team record for consecutive games on base streak, at 79. In 1984, he played collegiate summer baseball with the Hyannis Mets of the Cape Cod Baseball League and was named a league all-star.

He debuted as a late season call up for the Cleveland Indians in September 1988. He had one hit (against Jerry Reuss) and one RBI in his MLB career. After retiring from playing, he became a fixture on the Atlanta baseball card show circuit as a dealer. He had one baseball card, the 1989 Donruss set #609, and he was listed in Beckett Baseball Card Monthly magazine for months, even after he retired.

References

Living people
1963 births
Cleveland Indians players
Georgia Tech Yellow Jackets baseball players
Hyannis Harbor Hawks players
Batavia Trojans players
Columbus Mudcats players
Kinston Indians players
Tucson Toros players
Waterbury Indians players
Waterloo Indians players
Williamsport Bills players